J. Don Ferguson (November 21, 1933 – October 1, 2008), sometimes credited as "Don Ferguson", was an American character actor who appeared in feature films and television programs. He was a prominent stage actor in Savannah, Georgia, regional stage theater productions. Ferguson also was an NCAA basketball tournament referee for ten years, and this experience led to his being cast in several related acting roles.

Filmography

Film

 The Longest Yard (1974) as Football Referee (uncredited)
 Gator (1976) as Bartender
 The Lincoln Conspiracy (1977) as Lt. Luther Baker
 Our Winning Season (1978) as Coach Michael Murphy
 Norma Rae (1979) as Peter Gallat
 The Prize Fighter (1979) as Referee #1
 Little Darlings (1980) as Husband
 The Long Riders (1980) as Preacher
 The Night the Lights Went Out in Georgia (1981) as Hawkins
 The Loveless (1981) as Tarver
 Sharky's Machine (1981) as Rally Emcee
 Tennessee Stallion (1982) as Fred
 The American Snitch (1983) as Sonny Barton
 Tank (1984) as Gov. Harold R. Sims, Tennessee
 Kidco (1984) as TV Show Announcer
 Maximum Overdrive (1986) as Andy
 Running Mates (1986) as Robert Adams
 Date with an Angel (1987) as Harlan Rafferty
 Final Cut (1988) as Sheriff Thompson
 Fast Food (1989) as Dean Witler
 The Return of Swamp Thing (1989) as Bob
 Freejack (1992) as Promoter
 My Cousin Vinny (1992) as Guard #1
 The Program (1993) as Referee
 Radioland Murders (1994) as Johnny Ace, Hard Boiled Dick (as Don Ferguson)
 The War (1994) as Mine Foreman
 Something to Talk About (1995) as Announcer
 Eddie (1996) as Game Referee
 Fled (1996) as Chairman
 Raney (1997) as Thurman Daddy Bell
 I Know What You Did Last Summer (1997) as MC
 Major League: Back to the Minors (1998) as Mick the Umpire
 Remember the Titans (2000) as Executive Director
 The Legend of Bagger Vance (2000) as Citizen
 Movievoyeur.com (2000) as Sheriff Ames
 The Substitute: Failure Is Not an Option (2001) as Colonel Teague
 Juwanna Mann (2002) as UBA Referee
 The Second Chance (2006) as Jeremiah Jenkins (final film role)

Television

 F. Scott Fitzgerald and 'The Last of the Belles''' (1974, TV Movie) as Man in Speakeasy
 The Greatest Gift (1974, TV Movie) as Jim Friedlin
 Summer of My German Soldier (1978, TV Movie) as Mr. Jackson
 I Know Why the Caged Bird Sings (1979, TV Movie) as Mr. Donleavy
 Barnaby Jones (1980, TV Series) as Ross Chapman
 When the Circus Came to Town (1981, TV Movie) as Andre Probashka
 Murder in Coweta County (1983, TV Movie) as Jim Hillin
 Windmills of the Gods (1988, TV Series) as Ian Villers
 Unconquered (1989, TV Movie) as Mr. Woods
 Traveling Man (1989, TV Movie) as Riker
 In the Heat of the Night (1989–1993, TV Series) as Rev. Winchell / Kevin Riley / Rev. Kenneth Haskell
 Murder in Mississippi (1990, TV Movie)
 When Will I Be Loved? (1990, TV Movie) as Man at Bar #1
 In the Line of Duty: Manhunt in the Dakotas (1991, TV Movie) as James Blasingame
 Nightmare in Columbia County (1991, aka Victim of Beauty, TV Movie) as Bob Smith
 In the Line of Duty: Street War (1992, TV Movie) as Gun Shop Owner
 I'll Fly Away (1993, TV Series) as Harry Saunders
 Linda (1993, TV Movie) as Davis Vernon
 A Kiss to Die For (1993, TV Movie) as Harold Graham
 Matlock (1993–1994, TV Series) as Reverend Wesley Masters / Mr. Walters / Mr. Bostwick
 Big Dreams & Broken Hearts: The Dottie West Story (1995, TV Movie) as Wendy Blevins
 From the Earth to the Moon'' (1998, TV Mini-Series) as Senator Stephen Young

References

External links

1933 births
2008 deaths
American male film actors
American male television actors
Actors from Savannah, Georgia
20th-century American male actors